James Docherty was a Scottish amateur footballer who played in the Scottish League for Queen's Park and Airdrieonians as a left half. He was capped by Scotland at amateur level.

References

Scottish footballers
Scottish Football League players
Queen's Park F.C. players
Association football wing halves
Scotland amateur international footballers
Living people
Year of birth missing (living people)
Place of birth missing (living people)
Airdrieonians F.C. (1878) players